Cooper Snowfield is a snowfield with an area of  about  in the Churchill Mountains. It was named after Alan K. Cooper, a marine geophysicist with the United States Geological Survey, Menlo Park, California, who was involved in drilling and seismic studies of the Antarctic continental margin for deriving paleoenvironments and ice sheet history, 1984–2002.

References
 

Snow fields of Oates Land